Sergey Kozhevnikov (Cyrillic: Сергей Кожевников; born 12 May 1970) is a retired Russian athlete who specialised in the 800 metres. He represented his country at one outdoor and two indoor World Championships.

His personal bests in the event are 1:46.25 outdoors (Tula 2001) and 1:46.13 indoors (Vienna 2002).

Competition record

References

1970 births
Living people
Russian male middle-distance runners
Russian Athletics Championships winners